Bill Sutherland may refer to:

 Bill Sutherland (ice hockey) (1934–2017), Canadian NHL player
 Bill Sutherland (Toronto politician)  (1926/27–1998), Canadian municipal politician
 T. Bill Sutherland (born 1942), American theoretical physicist

See also
 William Sutherland (disambiguation)